Caloptilia acrotherma is a moth of the family Gracillariidae. It is known from Indonesia (Java) and Sri Lanka.

The larvae feed on Atylosia candollei and Cajanus cajan. They probably mine the leaves of their host plant.

References

acrotherma
Moths of Asia
Moths described in 1908